The 2002 FIBA Europe Under-20 Championship for Women was the second edition of the FIBA Europe Under-20 Championship for Women. 12 teams featured the competition, held in Zagreb, Croatia, from 26 July to 4 August 2002. The Czech Republic won their first title.

Qualification

Twenty-five national teams entered the qualifying round. They were allocated in five groups. The first two teams of each group qualified for the tournament, where they joined Russia (qualified as title holders) and Croatia (qualified as hosts).

Group A

|}

Group B

|}

Group C

|}

Group D

|}

Group E

|}

Qualified teams

Preliminary round
The twelve teams were allocated in two groups of six teams each.

Group A

Group B

Knockout stage

9th–12th playoffs

Championship

5th–8th playoffs

Final standings

References

FIBA Europe Archive

2005
2002–03 in European women's basketball
2002–03 in Croatian basketball
International women's basketball competitions hosted by Croatia
International youth basketball competitions hosted by Croatia
2002 in youth sport